Farlowella odontotumulus is a species of armored catfish native to Ecuador and Venezuela.  In Ecuador it is found in the Aguarico River basin and in Venezuela it occurs in the Mavaca River basin.  This species grows to a length of  SL.

References
 

odontotumulus
Fish of South America
Fish of Ecuador
Fish of Venezuela
Fish described in 1997
Taxa named by Michael Eugene Retzer
Taxa named by Lawrence M. Page